Ostrzeszów District was a district within the Duchy of Wieluń. Its capital was Ostrzeszów. It was formed around 1378 from Wieluń Land and existed until 1391 when duchy was conquered by Kingdom of Poland.

Notes

References 

Duchy of Wieluń
14th-century establishments in Poland
14th-century disestablishments in Poland
States and territories established in the 1370s
States and territories disestablished in 1391